Tymon Tytus Chmielecki (born 29 November 1965) is a Polish prelate of the Catholic Church and a diplomat in the service of the Holy See.

Biography
Tymon Tytus Chmielecki was born on 29 November 1965 in Toruń, Poland. He was ordained a priest on 26 May 1991 by Pope John Paul II. He joined the diplomatic service of the Holy See on 1 July 1995 and was deployed to Georgia, Senegal, Austria, Ukraine, Kazakhstan, and Brazil. He also worked from 2015 to 2019 in Rome in the Section for Relations with States of the Secretariat of State.

On 26 March 2019, Pope Francis appointed him titular archbishop of Tres Tabernae and apostolic nuncio to Guinea and to Mali. He received his episcopal consecration on 13 May 2019 from Cardinal Pietro Parolin.

Writings
 Author: 
 Editor:

See also
 List of heads of the diplomatic missions of the Holy See

References

External links 
 Catholic Hierarchy: Archbishop Tymon Tytus Chmielecki 

1965 births
Living people
Apostolic Nuncios to Guinea
Apostolic Nuncios to Mali
People from Toruń